Emanuel Gould (May 30, 1904 – July 19, 1975) was an American animated cartoonist from the 1920s to the 1970s, best known for his contributions as a director, writer and animator for Screen Gems, and solely an animator for Warner Bros. Cartoons and DePatie–Freleng Enterprises.

Career 
Manny Gould began his career as a teenager working for several New York-based animation studios. He would later partner with Ben Harrison to form the short lived Harrison-Gould studios. Both later moved to Winkler Pictures to work on the Krazy Kat cartoon series as animators, writers and directors. After Charles Mintz took over Winkler Pictures, the studio was moved to Los Angeles in 1931 to develop The Charles Mintz Studio (later renamed Screen Gems) after establishing a partnership with Columbia Pictures. Also going with him were his sister Martha Barbara Gould and brothers Louis R., Allen, and Will Gould, a sports cartoonist for the Bronx Home News who drew the syndicated strip Red Barry in the 1930s and became a television and movie screenwriter. 

Gould would continue to work for the studio until 1941, when Columbia decided to "clean house" by laying off their in-house staff. He, along with Arthur Davis, Lou Lilly and Frank Tashlin, arrived at the Warner Brothers cartoon studio in 1942 where he worked as an animator for Bob Clampett. He would be credited in Clampett's latter shorts in the mid 40's, such as Buckaroo Bugs (1944), Baby Bottleneck (1946), The Great Piggy Bank Robbery (1946) and The Big Snooze (1946). Clampett however, left Warner Bros. in May 1945, and his unit was given to Arthur Davis. Gould would animate Davis' first three shorts until he moved to Robert McKimson's unit in 1947. Gould would also briefly freelance back to Screen Gems around the same time for the cartoon Mother Hubba-Hubba Hubbard.

His scenes can be identified for his loose rubber hose-like animation, preferring to the use of squash and stretch movements and strong acting, as well as overshooting. Micheal Barrier akin Gould's animation to "gaudy mini-carnivals".

Gould was hired in 1947 by Jerry Fairbanks Productions as a director for its animation department, where Lilly had gone to head the story department. His last credited cartoon at Warner Bros. was released in 1949, with The Windblown Hare, with his final contribution being Hippety Hopper the same year, where he was left uncredited. Lilly formed his own commercial animation company in 1952 and by the late 1950s hired Gould to be his animation director.

Later career and death 
In 1964, Gould returned to his career in animation, beginning with the Warner Bros. commercial department. He would also animate the Linus the Lionhearted television cartoons for Ed Graham Productions. Gould's biggest contribution during this time period was his role as an animator for DePatie-Freleng Enterprises, where he would work on The Pink Panther, The Ant and the Aardvark, Tijuana Toads and the Dr. Seuss animated adaptions. He also worked on the cartoon features Heavy Traffic for Ralph Bakshi and The Nine Lives of Fritz the Cat for Steve Krantz.

Gould died of cancer on July 19, 1975, the same week where he was supposed to be interviewed by Milton Gray.

References

External links 
 

1904 births
1975 deaths
Animators from New York (state)
Warner Bros. Cartoons people
Deaths from cancer in California